The Honduran Aviation Museum, (Museo del Aire de Honduras), is a museum foundation in Honduras, opened in September 2002 for the purpose of storing, preserving, restoring and exhibiting items related to Honduran aviation.

History
The  museum originated from the Honduran Air Force (FAH), which had stored and preserved aircraft and exhibits from the 1930s, some of which remained airworthy into the 1980s, such as a North American NA-42, Vought F4U Corsair and a North American AT-6. In 1986 representatives of the National Air and Space Museum of the Smithsonian Institution, gave the Honduran public chats and conferences and realized that the Honduran Institute of Culture Interamericana-IHCI had the potential for creating a museum of national aviation, It is so the initiative gives his first steps inside the command and active personnel of her FAH which interfere to such a degree of founding and organizing the "Museum of the Air of Honduras" the second step was the disposition to donate 12 aircraft in the Officials' Club of the FAH at the end of the 80s what determines the second stage in road surface for the organization of so important project. Later, in June, 2000 the first meeting with persons deepened formally into the project leads to the conclusion of a " Committee organizes Pro-museum of the Air ", summoned all for the Commander at the time colonel Gerardo E. Carvajal, And with participation of volunteers and other persons been interested in the aeronautical conservation of the historical heritage of the country. The committee presents and signs the document of Record of Constitution of the "Foundation Museum of the Aíre of Honduras" on August 30, 2000, in the facilities of the FAH sedate in the Airport Toncontín in the cardinal city of Tegucigalpa, M.D.C. the creation of the foundation it possesses the legal instruments of: Juridical Legal status with record Not. 102-2002; and, the Decree issued by the sovereign one National Congress of Honduras Down Not. 144-2003. The organized foundation has twenty-two volunteer members, most of whom in 2003 received museum training from the Francisco Morazán National Pedagogical University.

Aircraft on display 

The foundation and museum has twenty-five aircraft which were transferred to the organization through Decree No. 144-2003 issued by the National Congress and through private donations. The aircraft mostly belonged to the Honduran Air Force and the rest were donated by private persons.

 Beechcraft AT-11 FAH-105
 Beechcraft Twin Bonanza
 Bell P-63E Kingcobra FAH-402
 Bell UH-1B Iroquois FAH-934
 Bell 47G-4 FAH-910
 Canadair CL-13 Sabre Mk.4 FAH-3006
 Cessna T-41D Mescalero FAH-225
 Cessna U-17A Skywagon FAH-111
 Cessna A-37B Dragonfly FAH-1018
 Cessna 206 HR-IAD
 Cessna 337 Skymaster HR-HCM
 Curtiss C-46F Commando 44-78708
 Dassault Super Mystère B.2 FAH-2009
 Douglas C-47A FAH-306
 Douglas C-47B FAH-315
 Douglas DC-6 BuNo 152688
 Fiat F-86K Sabre FAH-1102
 Hughes TH-55A Osage FAH-917
 Lockheed T-33A FAH-1200
 North American AT-6C Texan FAH-205C
 North American NA-42 FAH-21
 North American T-28B Trojan FAH-230
 Stearman PT-17 FAH-46
 Vought F4U-5N Corsair FAH-609
 Vultee BT-13 FAH-60

Irreplaceable pieces
The NA-42 at the museum is the only remaining aircraft of that type in the world and the oldest surviving aircraft from the T-6 family. The museum's Vought F4U-5N Corsair, serial number FAH-609, is well known for taking part in the last combat between piston engine fighters, during the Football War between El Salvador and Honduras in 1969. During the war it was flown by Fernando Soto Henríquez "The Weak Spot".

Facilities
The area of the museum is of about five hectares of area located in the Air Honduran Force in Toncontín, Tegucigalpa, M.D.C. Hired by a term of hundred years with the State of Honduras and contract authorized by means of the Decree Not. 144-2003 issued by the National Congress. The infrastructure, it possesses a room of exhibitions and an outdoor exposure of the collection of the aircraft, besides appliances and historical pieces, photographs, documents, and some historical videoes, the above-mentioned to being catalogued in the future project of Aeronautical File of Honduras, dependence to being created by the F.M.A.H. Office of the administration, a book-keeper, and other one of exhibition, maintenance and restoration of planes and integrated by technical personnel in specialized maintenance of planes. A shop found in Toncontín's international Airport and other one in the building of exhibitions in order to achieve economic self-sufficiency. The Aeronautical Park was opened the public in September 2002.

Memberships of the museum
The Honduran Aviation Museum is part of the Latin American Society of Aviation Historians (LAAHS), the Ibero-American Federation of Air-Space Studies, and the Association of Aeronautical Museums of Latin America.

References

External links
Museo del Aíre de Honduras:
"Aviación Catracha", La Tribuna Daily News
Honduran Air Force  (consultado 2013)
Web History of Honduras  (consultado 1013)
History of Museum, ORRPP-FAH. (2013)

Aviation in Honduras
Museums in Honduras
Buildings and structures in Tegucigalpa
Aerospace museums
Military and war museums
2002 establishments in Honduras
Museums established in 2002